Phoe Chit (born Chit Myo Htike on 15 February ) is a prominent traditional leading Burmese dance actor in Myanmar Drama Event. He has found success in VCD distribution of his thabin performances, including Seven Kinds of Dance Performances in the Arts. He has since branched into the film industry, acting in films such as Law Mingala.

He founded the Phoe Chit theatre troupe. In 2012, he began constructing a housing complex for his troupe's performers in Mingaladon Township, Yangon, consisting of 200 homes and dance studios.             
He is founder and chairman of Sagaing United F.C., founded in 2015.
* On 30 November 2022, he is taken into custody for his role in opposing the military rule.

Early life and education
Phoe Chit was born on 15 February in Kanbalu, Sagaing Region, Myanmar to parents U Sein Win Thaung and Daw Thein Thein Mya. He is youngest of six siblings. He attended high school at B.E.H.S (1) Kanbalu. He graduated with a degree B.Sc (Maths) from Yadanabon University.

References

See also
Burmese dance
Anyeint

21st-century Burmese male actors
Burmese male stage actors
Burmese dancers
21st-century Burmese male singers
Living people
Year of birth missing (living people)